In mathematics, specifically functional analysis, a trace-class operator is a linear operator for which a trace may be defined, such that the trace is a finite number independent of the choice of basis used to compute the trace. This trace of trace-class operators generalizes the trace of matrices studied in linear algebra. All trace-class operators are compact operators. 

In quantum mechanics, mixed states are described by density matrices, which are certain trace class operators. 

Trace-class operators are essentially the same as nuclear operators, though many authors reserve the term "trace-class operator" for the special case of nuclear operators on Hilbert spaces and use the term "nuclear operator" in more general topological vector spaces (such as Banach spaces).

Note that the trace operator studied in partial differential equations is an unrelated concept.

Definition 

The trace is a sum on non-negative reals and is therefore a non-negative real or infinity. It can be shown that the trace does not depend on the choice of orthonormal basis.  

It can be shown that this is an absolutely convergent series of complex numbers whose sum does not depend on the choice of orthonormal basis.

When  is finite-dimensional, every operator is trace class and this definition of trace of  coincides with the definition of the trace of a matrix.

Equivalent formulations 
Given a bounded linear operator , each of the following statements is equivalent to  being in the trace class:
 
  is a nuclear operator.
  is equal to the composition of two Hilbert-Schmidt operators.
  is a Hilbert-Schmidt operator.
  is an integral operator.

Trace-norm 

We define the trace-norm of a trace class operator  to be the value

One can show that the trace-norm is a norm on the space of all trace class operators  and that , with the trace-norm, becomes a Banach space.

If  is trace class then

Examples 

Every bounded linear operator that has a finite-dimensional range (i.e. operators of finite-rank) is trace class; 
The composition of two Hilbert-Schmidt operators is a trace class operator.

Given any  define the operator  by  
Then  is a continuous linear operator of rank 1 and is thus trace class; 
moreover, for any bounded linear operator A on H (and into H),

Properties 

If  is a non-negative self-adjoint operator, then  is trace-class if and only if  Therefore, a self-adjoint operator  is trace-class if and only if its positive part  and negative part  are both trace-class. (The positive and negative parts of a self-adjoint operator are obtained by the continuous functional calculus.)

The trace is a linear functional over the space of trace-class operators, that is, 
The bilinear map  is an inner product on the trace class; the corresponding norm is called the Hilbert–Schmidt norm. The completion of the trace-class operators in the Hilbert–Schmidt norm are called the Hilbert–Schmidt operators.

 is a positive linear functional such that if  is a trace class operator satisfying  then 

Furthermore, under the same hypothesis,  and  
The last assertion also holds under the weaker hypothesis that A and T are Hilbert–Schmidt.

If A is trace-class, then one can define the Fredholm determinant of :  where  is the spectrum of  The trace class condition on  guarantees that the infinite product is finite: indeed, 
It also implies that  if and only if  is invertible.

If  is trace class then for any orthonormal basis  of  the sum of positive terms  is finite.

If  for some Hilbert-Schmidt operators  and  then for any normal vector   holds.

Lidskii's theorem 

Lidskii's theorem (named after Victor Borisovich Lidskii) states that

Note that the series on the right converges absolutely due to Weyl's inequality

between the eigenvalues  and the singular values  of the compact operator

Relationship between common classes of operators 

One can view certain classes of bounded operators as noncommutative analogue of classical sequence spaces, with trace-class operators as the noncommutative analogue of the sequence space  

Indeed, it is possible to apply the spectral theorem to show that every normal trace-class operator on a separable Hilbert space can be realized in a certain way as an  sequence with respect to some choice of a pair of Hilbert bases. To some extent, the relationships between these classes of operators are similar to the relationships between their commutative counterparts.

This allows to relate these classes of operators. The following inclusions hold and are all proper when  is infinite-dimensional: 

The trace-class operators are given the trace norm  The norm corresponding to the Hilbert–Schmidt inner product is 

Also, the usual operator norm is  By classical inequalities regarding sequences,

for appropriate  

It is also clear that finite-rank operators are dense in both trace-class and Hilbert–Schmidt in their respective norms.

Trace class as the dual of compact operators 

Let  we identify  with the operator  defined by

where  is the rank-one operator given by

This identification works because the finite-rank operators are norm-dense in  In the event that  is a positive operator, for any orthonormal basis  one has

where  is the identity operator:

But this means that  is trace-class. An appeal to polar decomposition extend this to the general case, where  need not be positive.

A limiting argument using finite-rank operators shows that  Thus  is isometrically isomorphic to

As the predual of bounded operators 

It follows that   the dual space of  This can be used to define the weak-* topology on

See also 

 
 
 Trace operator

References

Bibliography 

   
 Dixmier, J. (1969). Les Algebres d'Operateurs dans l'Espace Hilbertien. Gauthier-Villars.
  
  

Operator theory
Topological tensor products
Linear operators